SN-2 is a chemical compound which acts as an "agonist" (i.e. channel opener) for the TRPML3 calcium channel, with high selectivity for TRPML3 and no significant activity at the related TRPML1 and TRPML2 channels. It has demonstrated antiviral activity in an in vitro model.

See also 
 MK6-83
 ML2-SA1

References 

Tricyclic compounds
Calcium channel openers
Nitrogen heterocycles
Oxygen heterocycles